Kingston Saltpeter Cave is the largest cave in Bartow County, Georgia, United States of America, and was formerly used as a source of saltpeter, the critical oxidizing component of gunpowder, by the Confederate States of America during the American Civil War (1861–1865). The cave is now a preserved area composed of 40 acres of largely hardwood forest, underlain by a variety of wildflowers and mosses.

In late 1983 the property was acquired by the Felburn Foundation in order to preserve, maintain, and protect it for future generations.

References

General references
Sneed, Joel M., (2007), Bartow County Caves: History Underground in North Georgia, 161 pp.
Sneed, Joel M. and Larry O. Blair, eds., (2005), The Late Pleistocene Record of Kingston Saltpeter Cave, Bartow County, Georgia

External links
 Kingston Saltpeter Cave Nature Preserve

Caves of Georgia (U.S. state)
Protected areas of Bartow County, Georgia
Nature reserves in Georgia (U.S. state)
Landforms of Bartow County, Georgia